The Luiz de Queiroz College of Agriculture (Portuguese: Escola Superior de Agricultura Luiz de Queiroz, ESALQ) is a unit of the University of São Paulo  involved with research, teaching and extension of services in agriculture, animal husbandry,  agricultural and related sciences. The ESALQ main campus, located at Piracicaba, in the São Paulo State, has seven undergraduate and eighteen graduate programs. In addition, ESALQ keeps exchange agreements with many other institutions of the world, and welcome exchange students of several nationalities.

The ESALQ was founded in 1901, by Luiz de Queiroz, an agronomist and strongly innovative farmer and industrial entrepreneur. It is one of the most traditional schools of agricultural sciences of Brazil. It is composed by the main campus (campus "Luiz de Queiroz"), and the experimental stations of Areão farm (in Portuguese:"Fazenda Areão"), Anhembi, Anhumas and Itatinga.

Undergraduate Courses

  Administration
  Agronomic Engineering
  Biological Sciences
  Economic Sciences
  Environmental Management
  Food Science
  Forestry Engineering

Graduate programs

  Administration
  Agricultural Microbiology
  Agricultural Systems Engineering
  Animal Science and Pastures
  Applied Ecology
  Applied Economics
  Bioenergy (inter-unit)
  Bioinformatics (inter-unit)
  Crop Science
  Entomology
  Food Science and Technology
  Forest Resources
  Genetics and Plant Breeding
  International Cellular and Molecular Plant Biology (PhD) (USP/ESALQ, Ohio State University, Rutgers University)
  Plant Pathology
  Plant Physiology and Biochemistry
  Soil and Plant Nutrition
  Statistics and Agricultural Experimentation

Notable alumni
José Graziano da Silva – Director General of the Food and Agriculture Organization (2012-2015)

External links
 http://www.en.esalq.usp.br/

University of São Paulo